In Switzerland, there are 11 wind farms in operation. Only wind farms or turbines with a rated capacity of over 1 megawatt are included in this list.


Source:

Wind farms in planning or under construction

See also 
 List of power stations in Switzerland

References

External links 
 Standorte von Windkraftanlagen in Betrieb

Switzerland
Wind farms
Renewable energy power stations in Switzerland